Hudler is a German language occupational surname, which means "rag trader", derived from the Middle High German hudel ("rag"). The name may refer to:

Jiří Hudler (born 1984), Czech ice hockey player
Rex Hudler (born 1960), American baseball player and commentator

See also
Hudler (grape), another name for the German/Italian wine grape Trollinger

References

German-language surnames